Umberto Prato (born 10 January 1959) is an Italian bobsledder. He competed in the four-man event at the 1984 Winter Olympics.

References

1959 births
Living people
Italian male bobsledders
Olympic bobsledders of Italy
Bobsledders at the 1984 Winter Olympics
Sportspeople from Merano